Puerto Lempira or Auhya Yari is the Miskito capital of the Gracias a Dios department in northeastern Honduras, located on the shores of the Caratasca Lagoon.  Though it does not have paved roads, it is the largest town in the La Mosquitia region.

The town is named for the 16th century leader of the indigenous Lenca peoples, Lempira, who directed an ultimately unsuccessful resistance against the Spanish conquistador forces in the 1530s.

Puerto Lempira became the departmental capital in 1975, prior to which it was Brus Laguna.  In the 1980s, the town became a centre for CIA operations against the Sandinistas.

Its population is 20,190 (2020 calculation).

Puerto Lempira is sister city to Plattsburgh, New York, US, and has been since 2011.

Demographics
At the time of the 2013 Honduras census, Puerto Lempira municipality had a population of 47,528. Of these, 82.41% were Indigenous (81.98% Miskito), 14.86% Mestizo, 1.34% Afro-Honduran or Black, 1.27% White and 0.13% others.

Culture
Miskito culture is dominant, though not exclusive.

Language
Miskito language is dominant and official in the region, followed by Mayangna and Spanish.

Transportation

The city is served by Puerto Lempira Airport, which operates several flights a week on a regular schedule.

Climate
Like most of the Caribbean side of Central America, Puerto Lempira has a warm, humid and rainy tropical rainforest climate (Köppen Af). Its driest month of March, when the relentlessly wet trade winds are weakest, is only marginally rainy enough to avoid a tropical monsoon classification; however, between June and December monthly rainfall consistently averages above or near .

References

Municipalities of the Gracias a Dios Department